Folsom station may refer to:

Folsom Depot, a historic train station in Folsom, California
Historic Folsom station, a light rail station in Folsom, California
The Embarcadero and Folsom station, a light rail station in San Francisco, California

See also
Folsom (disambiguation)